Latshaw is a surname. Notable people with the surname include:

Bob Latshaw (1917–2001), American baseball player and manager
Robert T. Latshaw (1925–1956), American Korean War flying ace
Steve Latshaw (born 1959), American screenwriter, producer, and director